The 2017 Quidditch Premier League season was the league's first, and was contested by eight teams over the course of the 2017 summer. The eight teams were split into two divisions, with the North Division composed of the Northern Watch, Yorkshire Roses, East Midlands Archers, and West Midlands Revolution, and the South Division composed of the London Monarchs, Southeast Knights, Southwest Broadside, and Eastern Mermaids.

During the regular season, each division held three 'fixtures', which saw each team in that division attend and participate in round robin games. In total, teams played 12 games each during the regular season, with a total of 36 games played in total. Based on the results of those fixtures, the teams were seeded for the QPL Championship, which all eight qualified for. The championship was decided with a series of double-elimination matches, with eliminated teams going on to contest the lower places of the standings.

Regular season

Divisional fixtures
A total of six fixtures were held across the UK, split between the North and South Divisions.

Final divisional standings

Championship
The West Midlands Revolution won the 2017 QPL Championship, played at the KCOM Craven Park Stadium in Hull, ending the season with a perfect 16–0 record. They defeated the Southeast Knights 140*-70 in the final match. By winning the title, the West Midlands Revolution became the inaugural winners of the Quidditch Premier League.

The Championship format consisted of a double elimination bracket which was then split into upper and lower brackets, giving full placings from 1st to 8th. The latter stages of the upper bracket and lower bracket can be seen below.

Upper bracket

Lower bracket

See also

QuidditchUK
International Quidditch Association
Major League Quidditch
Quidditch (sport)
Fictional Quidditch

References

External links
Quidditch Premier League official website

Quidditch competitions
2016 in British sport